The 2002-03 Tercera División season ran from August 2002 to June 2003. The promotion play-off finals were held in June 2003.

Group I

Group II

Group III

Group IV

Group V

Group VI

Group VII

Group VIII

Group IX

Group X

Group XI

Group XII

Group XIII

Group XIV

Group XV

Group XVI

Group XVII

Promotion play-off
Source:

References

External links
Futbolme.com

 
Tercera División seasons
4
Spain
2002 in sports
2003 in sports